Shwe Taung Group of Companies (Shwe Taung Group) is a Myanmar conglomerate. It has a large construction and engineering arm and is the parent company of a cement business in Myanmar. It also own Octagon International Service Trading which is the importer of machinery and construction vehicles.

Shwe Taung Group was formerly known as Olympic Construction Company, and was renamed Shwe Taung Group in 2004 after the banking scandal, money laundering accusation and drug links against the affiliated Asia Wealth Bank by the US department of Treasury and the bank's subsequent sanction in 2003 by the US Government and closure by the Government of Myanmar.

Suspected money laundering and drug links
As recent as 2007, the US continue to suspect Shwe Taung Group (formerly Olympic Construction Group) of laundering drug money, as evident by the leaked US embassy cable exposed by wiki-leaks. Law enforcement agencies continue to suspect Shwe Taung group chairman, Aik Htun, close ties to the drug traffickers and the "rich investors" behind Shwe Taung Group is questionable with some claiming Aik Htun is just a "front man" for various parties.

Key figures

The Chairman of Shwe Taung Group is Aik Htun, also spelt Eike Htun, while his son, Aung Zaw Naing, is Managing Director.

(variously spelt Eik Tun, Eike Htun, and Aik Tun) is a prominent Burmese businessman, best known as the managing director and vice chairman of the sister company of Olympic Construction company, the Asia Wealth Bank, which was Burma's largest private bank until the banking crisis of 2003. The US Secretary of Treasury also designated Asia Wealth Bank as financial institutions of primary money laundering concern  and the department report notes that the Asia Wealth bank have been linked to narcotics trafficking organizations in Southeast Asia. This findings by the US treasury is only rescinded the against the bank as the results of the revocation of the bank licenses by the government of Myanmar, not because of remedial actions by the bank.

See also
Asia Wealth Bank
Eike Htun

References

External links
fincen.gov

Conglomerate companies of Myanmar
Holding companies established in 1990
1990 establishments in Myanmar